Vladimir Plotnikov may refer to:

 Vladimir Plotnikov (politician) (born 1961), Russian politician
 Vladimir Plotnikov (footballer) (born 1986), Kazakhstani footballer

  (1873—1947), Soviet scientist 
  (born 1932), Russian politician, member of the Federation Council
  (born 1943), Russian diplomat